Agnes Rossi (born 1959) is an American fiction writer.

Biography 

Rossi was born in Paterson, New Jersey, in 1959 to an Irish-American mother and an Italian-American father. She earned a bachelor's degree at Rutgers University and an M. A. degree in English from New York University. Her first book, a collection of short stories titled Athletes and Artists, won the New York University Prize for Fiction in 1987. In her 1992 collection, The Quick: A Novella and Stories, characters search for human connection to escape from the anonymity and solitude to which they seem doomed.

In her novella, The Quick, she explores Italian-American themes, albeit evasively, according to one reviewer. Another writes, "For Agnes Rossi, the Italian American background is attenuated into accents of detail and character." The protagonist in The Quick rises to the middle class by way of marriage, only to sink back into the economic instability of the working class she came from. Her first full-length novel, Split Skirt (1994), explores the relationship between two women who, despite differences in age, social class, and ethnicity, develop a friendship while incarcerated for three days in the Hackensack county jail. The Houseguest (1999), is set in 1934, and the protagonist is Irish.

Rossi's work has been well received, particularly The Quick. Edvidge Giunta writes, "Rossi's concern with investigating ethnic intersections, her rejection of simplistic notions of ethnic identity, and her exploration of narrative strategies make her one of today's significant contemporary Italian American authors."

Works 
 Athletes and Artists: Stories New York : New York University Press, 1987. , 
 The Quick: A Novella and Stories New York: Norton, 1992. , 
 Split Skirt New York: Random House, 1994. , 
 ''The Houseguest: A Novel New York, N.Y. : Plume, 1999. ,

References

Further reading 

 
 

1959 births
20th-century American writers
20th-century American women writers
21st-century American writers
21st-century American women writers
American writers of Italian descent
American people of Irish descent
Rutgers University alumni
New York University alumni
Living people